Bryn Hoffman (born June 14, 1997) is a Canadian pair skater.  She previously competed with Bryce Chudak, winning the junior silver medal at the 2016 Canadian Nationals, and competing at the 2016 World Junior Championships in Debrecen, Hungary. They placed sixth in the short program, tenth in the free skate, and eighth overall.

Hoffman/Chudak withdrew from the 2014 Canadian Nationals due to Chudak's shoulder injury. They were coached by Anabelle Langlois and Cody Hay in Calgary, Alberta.

Programs 
(with Chudak)

Competitive highlights 
JGP: Junior Grand Prix

With Chudak

References

External links 
 

1997 births
Canadian female pair skaters
Living people
Figure skaters from Calgary
Sportspeople from Whitehorse